Michael Rasztovits, nicknamed 'Rasto' (born 16 February 1984) is an Austrian darts player.

Career
Since 2011, Rasztovits has taken part in PDC events. He has played in Qualifying School from 2013 onwards but has never won enough games to win a PDC Tour Card. He took part in the 2014, 2015 and 2016 qualifiers for the UK Open but didn't manage to qualify.

Rasztovits qualified for the 2016 PDC World Darts Championship after defeating Boris Krčmar in the Final of the Eastern Europe Qualifier. He was beaten 2–0 by Rob Szabo in the preliminary round. He won a match at a European Tour event for the first time when he knocked out 1996 BDO world champion Steve Beaton 6–4 at the 2016 Gibraltar Darts Trophy. Rasztovits was defeated by a reversal of this scoreline in the second round by Kim Huybrechts.

World Championship results

PDC

 2016: Preliminary Round (lost to Rob Szabo 0–2)

References

External links

Living people
Austrian darts players
1984 births
People from Oberpullendorf District
Sportspeople from Burgenland
Professional Darts Corporation associate players
21st-century Austrian people